Mirny (Russian: Ми́рный, literally "Peaceful")  was a 20-gun sloop-of-war of the Imperial Russian Navy, the second ship of the First Russian Antarctic Expedition in 1819–1821, during which Fabian Gottlieb von Bellingshausen (commander of the lead ship Vostok) and Mikhail Lazarev (commanding Mirny) circumnavigated the globe, discovered the continent of Antarctica and twice circumnavigated it, and discovered a number of islands and archipelagos in the Southern Ocean and the Pacific.

History 

Mirny was under construction  in 1818 at Olonetskaya Shipyards, Lodeynoye Pole. It was initially named Ladoga (after Lake Ladoga), but when a new ship became needed for an Antarctic expedition, the decision was taken not to build a completely new one, but to refit Ladoga. It was reconstructed under surveillance of its future commander Mikhail Lazarev.

On  Vostok under the captaincy of Commander Fabian Gottlieb von Bellingshausen, the leader of the expedition, alongside Mirny under the command of Lieutenant Commander Mikhail Lazarev left Kronshtadt  and on  reached the shore of Antarctica, which was sighted for the first time in history. After repair in Sydney in Australia, the expedition explored the tropical parts of the Pacific, and on  again turned to Antarctica. On  the sloops reached the southernmost point of their voyage at 69° 53' S and 92° 19' W. On  they returned to Kronshtadt.

In 751 days they covered 49 723 miles (circa 92 300 km). Apart from the discovery of the world's sixth continent, Antarctica, 29 islands were mapped and complex oceanographic works carried out. A medal was issued by the Russian Admiralty to commemorate the expedition.

Named in honor 

 Mirny Rupes, a mountain chain on planet Mercury.
 Mirny Peak, a prominent peak, 750 m, 4 nautical miles (7 km) northeast of Enigma Peak in the north part of Rothschild Island, presumably first seen from a distance in 1821 by the First Russian Antarctic Expedition.
 Mirny Station, a Russian Antarctic research station on the coast of the Davis Sea, established on February 13, 1956 by the 1st Soviet Antarctic Expedition.
 Mirny Peninsula, on which Mirny Station is located.

References 

 Морской энциклопедический словарь. Л.: Судостроение, 1991.  
 Mirny, with model scheme at hobbyport.ru 

Ships of the Imperial Russian Navy
Exploration ships
Sloops
1819 ships